CDTI Advanced Materials, Inc. (formerly Clean Diesel Technologies, Inc.) is an American company that focuses on providing vehicle emissions control systems for heavy duty and light duty diesel pollution control. The company has two divisions, including Heavy Duty Diesel Systems division, which focusing on developing and producing exhaust emission control device, and Catalyst division engaged in developing catalyst applied for emission reduction. The company has two self-developed and patented intellectual properties including MPC, a catalyst manufacturing process, and Platinum Plus, a diesel soluble additive. Their products have received US Environmental Protection Agency ("EPA") verification and have been widely used in highway automobile engines.

Background
CDTi was founded in 1996 and based in Ventura, California. Despite the core business in US, it also operates in Canada, France, Japan and Sweden. In September 2012, the company and its subsidiaries changed their names to CDTi and operates under this name. With the increasingly significant exhaust pollution control situation worldwide, the company provides devices for internal combustion engines. It generated a revenue of $60.5 million in 2012 with an increase of 40.5% in Catalyst division.

In December, 2013, Its product Purifilter(R)EGR and its off-road version Purifilter(R)OR, which were developed applying MPC technology to control exhaust emission, received the verification of US Environmental Protection Agency ("EPA"), which indicated that the product should be used in a majority of heavy highway engines in US.

References

Manufacturing companies based in California
Companies based in Ventura County, California
Manufacturing companies established in 1996
1996 establishments in California
Companies formerly listed on the Nasdaq
American companies established in 1996
Companies traded over-the-counter in the United States